Provincial elections are scheduled to be held in the Pakistani province of Khyber Pakhtunkhwa on 28 May 2023 to elect a new provincial legislature.

Electoral system 
The 145 seats of the Khyber Pakhtunkhwa Assembly consist of 115 general seats, whose members are elected by the first-past-the-postvoting system through single-member constituencies. 26 seats are reserved for women and 8 seats are reserved for non-Muslims. The members on these seats are elected through proportional representation based on the total number of general seats secured by each political party.

Background 
In the 2018 election, the Pakistan Tehreek-e-Insaf (PTI) won a landslide victory in the province by securing a two-thirds majority in the Khyber Pakhtunkhwa Assembly. The PTI became the only party in the province’s history to return to government with more seats after completing a 5-year term.

Before the 2018 elections, Jamiat Ulema-e-Islam (F) (JUI-F) and Jamaat-e-Islami (JI) restored their electoral alliance, the Muttahida Majlis-e-Amal, to counter the PTI’s support but failed to make gains and in fact lost even more seats.

The Pashtun nationalist and leftist Awami National Party (ANP) also failed to counter the PTI, but slightly increased their share of seats. 

The conservative Pakistan Muslim league (N) (PML-N) once the most popular party in the Hazara Division, also faced defeat and was nearly wiped out from the region.

Due to circumstances arising after the successful motion of no confidence against Prime Minister Imran Khan, a motion of no confidence was also filed to remove Chief Minister Mahmood Khan from office. The motion was rejected, as 88 votes were cast against the motion to just 2 in favor.

On June 26, 2022, the PTI flipped the PK-7 (Swat-VI) constituency in a by-election, winning by a margin of 4,341 votes and defeated the ANP, which enjoyed the support of the Pakistan Democratic Movement (PDM), particularly the JUI(F) and PML(N).

On 17 January 2023, Chief Minister Khan sent a letter to Governor Haji Ghulam Ali, advising him to dissolve the Provincial Assembly. Ali accepted the advice the next day. Elections must be conducted within 90 days of the dissolution, meaning by or before 18 April 2023.

After two days of talks, on 20 January 2023, the government and opposition agreed on appointing Muhammad Azam Khan, a former bureaucrat, as the caretaker Chief Minister.

After a month of delay from Governor Ali and the Election Commission of Pakistan (ECP), President Arif Alvi decided to unilaterally appoint 9 April 2023 as the date for the provincial election.

On 1 March 2023, in a 3-2 split verdict, the Supreme Court ruled that since Governor Ali had dissolved the Assembly, he was "in breach of his constitutional duty" by not appointing an election date and should immediately do so, after consultation with the ECP. As a consequence, the date appointed by President Alvi was set aside.

Two weeks after the verdict, on 15 March 2023, Governor Ali had fixed the date for the provincial election to be 28 May 2023.

Opinion polls

Results

Result by Party

Results by division

Results by district

Results by constituency

See also 

 2023 Punjab provincial election

Notes

References

Elections in Khyber Pakhtunkhwa
2023 elections in Pakistan
Khyber Pakhtunkhwa